Sonora was a community in Pinal County, Arizona, until its residents were moved to Kearny, Arizona and the site was demolished to expand the Ray mine.

References

External links
 
 Sonora – ghosttowns.com

Former populated places in Arizona
Ghost towns in Arizona